"Talk" is a single by American rapper Yeat, released through Field Trip Recordings, Listen to the Kids, Geffen Records, and Interscope Records as a single on September 2, 2022. The song serves as the lead single to Yeat's sixth extended play Lyfe, and found success after going viral on TikTok. In the United States, the song entered at number 42 on the Billboard Hot 100.

Composition
On "Talk", Yeat raps in a braggadocious manner about fame, money, and the success of his music. The beginning of the song features a sample of a video taken in February 2022 of fans being interviewed outside a canceled Yeat concert. Throughout the track, Yeat makes references to luxury objects such as sports cars and makes a reference to Tonka trucks as he frequently does in his music: "Huh, riding in that, B-U-L-L Tonka truck / Riding 'round with these bust-down watches on me, I got my blicky tucked / Headin' number one up on these charts, bitch, yeah, it's stuck as fuck".

Critical reception
Kieran Press-Reynolds of Pitchfork noted the song's harsh instrumentals and unnerving background vocals, writing: "Police sirens set a frantic scene, and then a shrieking synth catapults Yeat's flexes into the sky: "Head #1 up on these charts, we stuck or what?" Mangled background vocals creep like demonic backup singers shadowing Yeat's steady voice. Barely any other major label rap production in 2022 sounds as unhinged and off-kilter as this."

Charts

Certifications

References

2022 singles
2022 songs
Yeat songs
Geffen Records singles